The Unimog 70200 is the first series production model of the Unimog series, made by . It was manufactured in Boehringer's Göppingen plant from June 1948 to April 1951. In total, 600 units of the 70200 have been made. Manufacture of the Unimog was sold to Daimler-Benz in October 1950, where it was modified for mass production. This mass production optimised Unimog is known as Unimog 2010.

The name Unimog 70200 was chosen because of Boehringer's cost centre. All Unimog 70200 vehicle identification numbers begin with 70200. Minuscules were used to differentiate between certain models. It is said that approximately 100–120 Unimog 70200s still exist today.

History

Development 

Originally, the Unimog was invented by German engineer Albert Friedrich, who worked for Daimler-Benz during World War II, designing aircraft engines. After World War II, Friedrich, now unemployed, wanted to develop an agricultural vehicle in case the Morgenthau Plan would become reality. Friedrich's idea was designing a vehicle similar to an agricultural tractor with a hitch and PTOs, but much more offroad capable and fitted with all-wheel drive. Furthermore, a canvas roof and a flatbed were planned to be key elements of that vehicle.

The earliest plans were completed in late 1945; in November that year, a Production order was granted by the US Military administration, meaning that it was officially believed that the vehicle would not have any military purpose, and Friedrich was allowed to develop the vehicle and build ten prototypes. For this purpose, Friedrich signed a development contract with the jewelry factory Erhard & Söhne in Schwäbisch Gmünd, which at that time produced gold and silver handicrafts. It was planned that two engineers would work on the project, but in January 1946, a third engineer, Heinrich Rößler, joined the team. Heinrich Rößler, who also used to be a Daimler-Benz employee during World War II, is responsible for the main development work. He later became the head of Unimog development at Daimler-Benz.

The first technical drawings were completed in March 1946. Rößler put a lot of emphasis on the functionality of the vehicle, for instance, the track width measures exactly , which equals two rows of potatoes. Both front and rear axle with reduction gears were planned to be technically identical live axles, welded together from just two preformed metal panels each; they were supposed to have four drive joints only. Later plans also included differential locks for the axles and gearbox, and coil springs with hydraulic shock absorbers instead of leaf springs for the suspension.

First prototypes and engine development 

The first prototypes were completed in late 1946 at Erhard & Söhne. They were fitted with the Otto engine M 136. The first four prototypes do not exist anymore; they were either wrecked or lost. On 9 October 1946, the first test drive was conducted. In late autumn 1946, the vehicle was presented to experts and engineers. Engineer Hans Zabel made the note „Universal-Motor-Gerät“ (Universal-Motor-Gadget), which led to the acronym „Unimog“. On 20 November 1946, the vehicle had officially received its name. Prototypes U 5 and U 6 were made in the Boehringer plant in Göppingen and were already fitted with the OM 636 Diesel engine. Today, prototype U 5 is situated in the agricultural museum of the University of Hohenheim, prototype U 6 is on display in the Unimog museum in Gaggenau.

Daimler-Benz had successfully brought a Diesel engine for passenger cars to market in the mid-1930s, the Mercedes-Benz OM 138. Development of a successor for this engine started in the days of World War II. In 1948, it was ready for mass production, but had not yet been used for Mercedes-Benz passenger cars. The Unimog engineers had decided in 1947, that a Diesel engine instead of an Otto engine should be used for the Unimog. As they had a good relationship with Daimler-Benz, the engineers decided to use the then in development successor of the OM 138. This is the reason why the OM 138 successor, known as OM 636, was already used for Unimog series production in 1948, before it had officially been introduced in 1949.

Manufacture at Boehringer and sale of Unimog

The official Unimog presentation was held in 1947. Erhard & Söhne was not able to mass-produce the Unimog, which is why Gebr. Boehringer in Göppingen was ordered to manufacture it. This way, Boehringer, originally a tool manufacturer, could avoid dismantling. Erhard & Söhne then became a supplier for the Unimog production. Pre-series production finally started in 1948; the same year, the Unimog was exhibited by Mercedes-Benz at the DLG-exhibition in Frankfurt (150 orders for the Unimog were placed). The first patent for the Unimog's portal axles was filed on 21 November 1948 under the number 950 430. Official start of the series production was in February 1949.

Boehringer did not use modern methods of mass production, instead, all Unimogs were solely built by hand. Starting in 1949, 90 additional employees worked on the Unimog project, and a sales and distribution network as well as a customer service were established. The highest monthly production rate peak was 50 Unimogs per month. This was not enough to meet customer demands, it was foreseeable that Boehringer was incapable of manufacturing the Unimog over a long period of time. Therefore, the Unimog was sold to engine supplier Daimler-Benz in October 1950. Production in Göppingen ceased by April 1951. Then, production was moved to the Mercedes-Benz plant Gaggenau. Production of the 70200's successor, the Unimog 2010, began in June 1951. Erhard & Söhne, who manufactured the Unimog axles, remained a supplier for Daimler-Benz until 1963.

Technical description 

It has four wheels of the same size, a ladder frame made of U-shaped sections, and front and rear live axles with portal gears and bolted axle covers. The axles are coil sprung (with hydraulic shock absorbers). Torque tubes, transverse links, and panhard rods are the main parts of the suspension system. The tyres are multi purpose tyres (6.5 – 18 in), that are designed both for on- and off road use. The Unimog has four hydraulic drum brakes.

A passenger car engine, type OM 636.912 is the Unimog's powerplant. The OM 636 is a straight-four, water-cooled, naturally aspirated precombustion chamber engine with overhead valves, using the Diesel operating principle. It displaces  and produces . The engine is installed longitudinally, slightly inclined, and has an electric starter. Unlike the following OM 636 family engines, the OM 636.912 has two valve covers.

The gearbox is a constant mesh gearbox with six forward and two reverse gears. The rear axle is permanently driven, enabling front wheel drive (which does not require pressing the clutch) locks both axles.

Bibliography 

Lutz Nellinger: Der Unimog: Arbeitstier und Kultmobil. Komet, Köln 2016, .
Carl-Heinz Vogler: Unimog 411: Typengeschichte und Technik. GeraMond, München 2014, .
Carl-Heinz Vogler: Typenatlas Unimog. Alle Unimog-Klassiker seit 1946 bis 1993. GeraMond, München 2015, .

References 

Tractors